Desforges is a French surname. Notable people with the surname include:

Émilie Desforges (born 1983), Canadian alpine skier
Fannie Desforges, Canadian ice hockey player
Pierre Desforges Sam, Haitian diplomat

See also
Barthélemy Hus-Desforges (1699–1786), French comedian
Pierre-Louis Hus-Desforges (1773–1838), French classical cellist, composer and conductor

French-language surnames